Paradise Heights is a census-designated place and an unincorporated area in Orange County, Florida, United States. The population was 1,215 at the 2010 census. It is part of the Orlando–Kissimmee Metropolitan Statistical Area.

Geography
Paradise Heights is located at  (28.622426, -81.544987).

According to the United States Census Bureau, the CDP has a total area of 1.2 km (0.5 mi2), all land.

Demographics

As of the census of 2000, there were 1,310 people, 457 households, and 301 families residing in the CDP.  The population density was 1,076.2/km (2,778.2/mi2).  There were 498 housing units at an average density of 409.1/km (1,056.1/mi2).  The racial makeup of the CDP was 80.53% White, 2.98% African American, 0.69% Native American, 0.46% Asian, 0.69% Pacific Islander, 12.98% from other races, and 1.68% from two or more races. Hispanic or Latino of any race were 22.82% of the population.

There were 457 households, out of which 34.6% had children under the age of 18 living with them, 43.5% were married couples living together, 15.1% had a female householder with no husband present, and 34.1% were non-families. 25.2% of all households were made up of individuals, and 7.7% had someone living alone who was 65 years of age or older.  The average household size was 2.85 and the average family size was 3.35.

In the CDP, the population was spread out, with 28.9% under the age of 18, 11.0% from 18 to 24, 34.0% from 25 to 44, 18.5% from 45 to 64, and 7.6% who were 65 years of age or older.  The median age was 32 years. For every 100 females, there were 111.0 males.  For every 100 females age 18 and over, there were 113.3 males.

The median income for a household in the CDP was $30,038, and the median income for a family was $34,438. Males had a median income of $22,109 versus $17,200 for females. The per capita income for the CDP was $13,115.  About 9.1% of families and 14.9% of the population were below the poverty line, including 23.5% of those under age 18 and 15.4% of those age 65 or over.

References

Census-designated places in Orange County, Florida
Greater Orlando
Census-designated places in Florida